Barool is a national park in New South Wales, Australia, 479 km north of Sydney. It is located north of the River Mann and is characterized by high eucalyptus forests.

29 species of birds have been recorded in the park.

See also
 Protected areas of New South Wales
 High Conservation Value Old Growth forest

References

National parks of New South Wales
Protected areas established in 1999
1999 establishments in Australia